Union Observatory also known as Johannesburg Observatory (078) is a defunct astronomical observatory in Johannesburg, South Africa that was operated between 1903 and 1971. It is located on Observatory Ridge, the city's highest point at 1,808 metres altitude in the suburb Observatory.

At the observatory, 578 identifications of minor planet were made, a record number at the time. The Minor Planet Center credits the observatory as the site where 147 minor planets were discovered by astronomers Harry Wood, Cyril Jackson, Hendrik van Gent, Ernest Johnson, Ejnar Hertzsprung, Jacobus Bruwer and Joseph Churms (see ).

History 
The origins of the observatory began when Theodore Reunert of the South African Association for the Advancement of Science petitioned Alfred Milner Governor of the Transvaal Colony on 29 October 1902 for the establishment of a meteorological and astronomical observatory in Johannesburg. Assistant Colonial Secretary W.H. Moor agreed to the project on 17 December 1902 with the budget increased from £1,350 to £5,629 due to equipment changes. 

On 1 April 1903, a new Meteorological Department was temporarily established in Johannesburg. A location was sought for the new observatory and the Johannesburg Town Council made a decision on 12 May 1903, located within the municipal boundaries. The land of eight acres, on a ridge west of the Indian War Memorial, was on the northern boundary of the farm Doornfontein, presently part of the suburb Observatory and was given as a gift by the Bezuidenhout family, with a further two acres sold for £500. The land was given only for the use of science and a road, later called Observatory Avenue, was also to be built close to the site. The observatory building was built and the formal opening took place on  17 January 1905 by Governor Milner, but had no astronomical equipment.

In 1906 it was lent a Hamberg universal instrument (2 5/8-inch object glass) by Dr Oskar Backlund. In September 1907 a 9-inch Grubb refractor was now used but repolished in 1908. Mr J. Franklin-Adams gifted the observatory a 10-inch triple O.G. Cooke Star-Camera in 1909. J.B. Rissik, Minister for Lands, permitted the purchase of a 26-inch refracting telescope from Sir Howard Grubb in 1909.

With the formation of the Union of South Africa in 1910, South Africa's two colonial observatories came under the control of the Minister of the Interior. With the removal of the meteorological functions, the observatory was renamed Observatory of the Union of South Africa (Union Observatory) on 1 April 1912. It became the Republic Observatory in 1961.

Well remembered for the quality of its Directors, work done on minor planets and the discovery of Proxima Centauri, growing light pollution problems in Johannesburg led to its closure in 1971–1972. The Observatory's buildings at 18a Gill Street, Observatory, Johannesburg, still exist.

At that time the South African government decided to amalgamate all astronomical research into one body, which later became known as the South African Astronomical Observatory (SAAO); it has its headquarters in Cape Town and has Sutherland as its outstation. The main Cape telescopes were moved to Sutherland, and the Radcliffe Observatory at Pretoria was also dismantled.

The main-belt asteroid 1585 Union, discovered by Ernest Johnson in 1947, was named for the Union observatory.

Name changes 
Union Observatory went through a number of name changes:
 1903–1909: Transvaal Meteorological Department
 1909–1912: Transvaal Observatory 
 1912–1961: Union Observatory
 1961–1971: Republic Observatory

Directors 
Its directors were:
 1903–1927: Robert Innes 
 1927–1941: Harry Edwin Wood 
 1941–1956: Willem Hendrik van den Bos 
 1957–1965: William Stephen Finsen
 1965–1971: Jan Hers (1915–2010)

Leiden Southern Station 

The Leiden Southern Station was a collaboration between the Dutch Leiden Observatory and Union Observatory. From 1938 to 1954 it was an annex to the Union Observatory, and was moved to Hartbeespoort in 1954 due to light pollution. It operated until 1978.

Discoveries

List of discovered minor planets 

The Minor Planet Center credits Union Observatory ("Johannesburg"), as the site of 147 minor planet discoveries, made by the following list of astronomers:

  Harry Edwin Wood
  Cyril Jackson
  Hendrik van Gent
  Ernest Leonard Johnson
  Ejnar Hertzsprung
  Jacobus Albertus Bruwer
  Joseph Churms

References

External links
 
 

Astronomical observatories in South Africa
Buildings and structures in Johannesburg
Defunct astronomical observatories